Picture Show was a weekly film magazine, published in the United Kingdom between 3 May 1919 and 31 December 1960. It was one of the longest-running film entertainment magazines in Britain.

Overview
Picture Show was launched in 1919. It was published throughout its run by the Amalgamated Press/Fleetway Publications as a weekly magazine. In 1939 it absorbed another film magazine, Film Pictorial. In 1959 it absorbed TV Mirror.
Its publishers also produced the Picture Show Annual throughout its run.

See also
 Picturegoer

References

Film magazines published in the United Kingdom
Weekly magazines published in the United Kingdom
Defunct magazines published in the United Kingdom
Entertainment magazines published in the United Kingdom
Magazines established in 1919
Magazines disestablished in 1960